Din Zahur (born 19 January 1933) is a Pakistani wrestler. He competed in the men's freestyle bantamweight at the 1956 Summer Olympics.

References

1933 births
Living people
Pakistani male sport wrestlers
Olympic wrestlers of Pakistan
Wrestlers at the 1956 Summer Olympics
Place of birth missing (living people)